Philip Louis may refer to:

Philip Louis, Count Palatine of Neuburg or Philip Ludwig, (1547–1614) 
Philip Louis II, Count of Hanau-Münzenberg or Philip Ludwig, (1576–1612)
Philip Louis, Duke of Schleswig-Holstein-Sonderburg-Wiesenburg (1620–1689)

See also

Philip Lewis (disambiguation)